Sivaganga Lok Sabha constituency is one of the 39 Lok Sabha (parliamentary) constituencies in Tamil Nadu, a state in southern India. Its Tamil Nadu Parliamentary Constituency number is 31.

Demands of the people of Sivaganga Constituency

To setup a SIPCOT at karaikudi and to encourage more Industries in Sivaganga Constituency. To bring more investors and companies to the already existing SIPCOT at Manamadurai and there by increasing the employment opportunities to the constituency people. To provide more employment opportunities based on the Graphite based jobs in Sivaganga by utilizing the existing graphite mines as like similar to that of Andhra Pradesh's Rajahmundry and also to create Graphite Mineral based Industrial Cluster at Sivaganga. To operate the Tamil Nadu's only spices board Park in full fledged manner which is located at Sivaganga. To bring an Agro Based Industrial cluster related with Capsicum Plantation near Ilayangudi as these areas have more capsicum plantation. To provide and improve optimal situation for those employees who relay on wood charcoal (or charcoal heap) business in and around Manamadurai area and to improve the existing facilities for such businesses in that area thereby improving the employment opportunities by providing a favourable situation to them. To promote employment opportunities on Geographical Indication recognized clay iratics of Manamadurai, Kandangi Sarees, Tiruppachetti Billhooks, Aathangudi Tiles, Chettinad Cuisine. To promote Agro based Industries at Sivaganga and Manamadurai. To improve facilities available at the existing tourism spots in Thirupathur Constituency and Keezhadi. To improve facilities to the existing coir based industries at Thiruppathur and Singampuneri by providing favourable situation to them. To reconstruct the old airport at Karaikudi and bring it back to service. To provide stoppage for all trains at District Headquarters Railway Station Sivaganga (which includes 16618 - Coimbatore Rameswaram Express, 22535 - Rameswaram Banaras Express, 06036 and 06035 - Ernakulam Velankanni Express, 07355 and 07356 - Hubli Rameswaram Express, 22613 and 22614 - Shraddha Sethu Express, etc.) Since all of these trains are skipping sivaganga which caused huge inconvenience to many people of Sivaganga District.

Assembly segments
Sivagangai Lok Sabha constituency is composed of the following Tamil Nadu Legislative Assembly segments  post delimitation effective from fifteenth loksabha

Before 2009:

1.Thirumayam

2.Tirupathur

3.Karaikudi

4.Thiruvadanai

5.ilayankudi

6.Sivagangai

History
From 1967, the Sivanganga parliament seat was held by the Indian National Congress for nine times during 1980, 1984, 1989, 1991, 1999, 2004, 2009 and 2019 elections, ADMK twice during the 1977 and 2014 elections, Tamil Maanila Congress twice during 1996 and 1998 elections, and Dravid Munnetra Kazhagam twice during the 1967 and 1971 elections.

The current Member of Parliament from the constituency is Karti Chidambaram from the INC.

Members of the Parliament

Election results

General Election 2019

General Election 2014

General Election 2009

General Election 2004

General Election 1999

See also
 Sivaganga
 List of Constituencies of the Lok Sabha

References

 http://164.100.24.209/newls/lokaralpha.aspx?lsno=13

External links
Sivagangai lok sabha  constituency election 2019 date and schedule

Lok Sabha constituencies in Tamil Nadu